Neoregelia atroviridifolia is a species of flowering plant in the genus Neoregelia. This species is native to Brazil.

References

atroviridifolia
Flora of Brazil